Ormakalil Oru Manjukaalam is a 2015 musical love story. the music of Which is Composed by Antony Abraham. Ormakalil Oru Manjukaalam is produced under the banner of R T E Films by M N Thattot And distributed by Mollywood Monster

Cast

 Alwin
 Deepa Jayan
 Jagadish
 Janardhanan
 Kalabhavan Navas
 Noushad Mundakkayam
 Manoj Guinness
 Indrans
 Mamukkoya
 Vysakh
 Kulappulli Leela

References

2010s Malayalam-language films